Passala was a town of ancient Caria. Stephanus of Byzantium wrote that it belonged to the city of Milas.
 
Its site is located near Sakız, Asiatic Turkey.

References

Populated places in ancient Caria
Former populated places in Turkey
History of Muğla Province
Milas District